Kai Gehring (born 26 December 1977) is a German politician of the Green Party who has been serving as a Member of the German Parliament since 2005.

Early life and education
After receiving his Abitur in Velbert, Gehring majored in social sciences at the Ruhr University Bochum, earning his Diplom in 2003.

Political career

Career in state politics
Having joined the liberal party Alliance '90/The Greens in 1998, Gehring was part of the party’s leadership in North Rhine-Westphalia from 2000 until 2006, under chairwoman Sylvia Löhrmann.

Member of the German Parliament, 2005–present
Gehring was elected to the Bundestag in the 2005 federal election. Since joining the parliament, he has been serving on the Committee on Education, Research and Technology Assessment. He has been his parliamentary group’s spokesperson for youth (2005–2011), education (2011–2013), and universities (2005–2017). From 2018 until 2021, he also served on the Committee on Human Rights and Humanitarian Aid.

In addition to his committee assignments, Gehring has served as deputy chairman of the German-Greek Parliamentary Friendship Group (2013–2017); the Parliamentary Friendship Group for Relations with Arabic-Speaking States in the Middle East (since 2018), which is in charge of maintaining inter-parliamentary relations with Bahrain, Irak, Yemen, Jordan, Qatar, Kuwait, Lebanon, Oman, Saudi Arabia, Syria, United Arab Emirates and the Palestinian territories; and the Parliamentary Friendship Group for Relations with the Central African States (since 2018).

In the negotiations to form a so-called traffic light coalition of the Social Democratic Party (SPD), the Green Party and the Free Democrats (FDP) following the 2021 German elections, Gehring was part of his party's delegation in the working group on innovation and research, co-chaired by Thomas Losse-Müller, Katharina Fegebank and Lydia Hüskens.

Since December 2021, Gehring has been chairing the Committee on Education and Research.

In the negotiations to form a coalition government of the Christian Democratic Union (CDU) and the Green Party under Minister-President of North Rhine-Westphalia Hendrik Wüst following the 2022 state elections, Gehring was part of his party’s delegation in the working group on research, digitization and innovation, co-chaired by Anja Karliczek and Raoul Roßbach.

Other activities
 German Foundation for Peace Research (DSF), Member of the Board (since 2022)
 Aktion Deutschland Hilft (Germany's Relief Coalition), Member of the Board of Trustees (since 2019)
 Evangelisches Studienwerk Villigst, Member of the Board of Trustees
 Federal Agency for Civic Education (BPB), Member of the Board of Trustees
 FernUniversität Hagen, Deputy Chairman of the Parliamentary Advisory Board
 German National Association for Student Affairs, Ex-Officio Member of the Board of Trustees
 Heinrich Böll Foundation, Member of the Advisory Board on Student Affairs
 Leibniz Association, Member of the Senate
 Otto Benecke Foundation, Member of the Board of Trustees
 Amnesty International, Member
 Lesbian and Gay Federation in Germany (LSVD), Member

References

External links 
 
 Biography by the Green Parliamentary Group

1977 births
Living people
People from Mülheim
Gay politicians
German gay writers
LGBT members of the Bundestag
German sociologists
Members of the Bundestag for North Rhine-Westphalia
Members of the Bundestag 2021–2025
Members of the Bundestag 2017–2021
Members of the Bundestag 2013–2017
Members of the Bundestag 2009–2013
Members of the Bundestag 2005–2009
Members of the Bundestag for Alliance 90/The Greens